Renea paillona is a species of land snail in the family Aciculidae. It is native to France and Italy.

Distribution
This snail lives in moist deciduous forest habitat under leaf litter and ivy. It is known from only four locations around Nice and just over the border in Italy. It may be threatened by urbanization in the area.

References

 Bank, R. A.; Neubert, E. (2017). Checklist of the land and freshwater Gastropoda of Europe. Last update: July 16th, 2017

External links
 Boeters, H. D.; Gittenberger, E. & Subai, P. (1989). Die Aciculidae (Mollusca: Gastropoda Prosobranchia). Zoologische Verhandelingen. 252: 1-234. Leiden 

Renea (gastropod)
Molluscs of Europe
Gastropods described in 1989
Taxonomy articles created by Polbot